Nothing from Nothing was the first mini-album recorded by Ayumi Hamasaki, featuring Dohzi-T and DJ Bass and released on December 1, 1995. After the album failed to chart, her talent agency and record label, Nippon Columbia, dropped her. Due to her subsequent success, it is generally considered a collector's item. Since her first album under Avex Trax, A Song for ×× (1999), topped the Oricon charts, previously-sold copies of Nothing from Nothing have become sought-after items within her fan base. Musically, Nothing from Nothing is a hip hop album that features Hamasaki rapping on all of the tracks, except "Limit".

Track listing

References

1995 debut EPs
Ayumi Hamasaki EPs
Japanese-language EPs